Htanthi mont is a traditional Burmese snack or mont. It bears resemblance to the Chinese fa gao.

This snack is a steamed rice cake made of pulverised cooked rice or rice flour, coconut milk, baking soda, sugar, and the pulp of slightly fermented toddy palm and coconut fruits, and then garnished with coconut shavings.

References

Burmese cuisine
Foods containing coconut
Steamed foods
Burmese desserts and snacks
Rice cakes